James Sharman (20 June 1887 – 18 November 1965) was an Australian boxing troupe and entertainment impresario. His son also worked with him and took over for his father in 1955 after playing as a professional rugby league footballer.

Biography
Sharman was born in Narellan, New South Wales, the fifth of thirteen children to James Sharman and Caroline Brailsfield, he established a boxing tent in 1911 at Ardlethan near Temora. The tent visited 45 to 50 shows each year. His son, Jimmy Sharman Jr, took over the business in 1955. The tent formed part of the Australian Show landscape until 1971, when regulations barred boxers fighting more than once a week. A member of the "Showmans Guild of Australasia", he then turned to dodgem cars in partnership with Garry oneill Reg Grundy.

Jimmy Sharman jr.

Sharman junior was born, as James Michael Sharman in 1912 at Narrandera, New South Wales. He attended his first Sydney Royal Easter Show in 1926 working in his father's tent.
Sharman junior played rugby league for Western Suburbs Magpies. In 1938 he became First Grade captain. He retired after 7 seasons in 1939 to become a journalist, taking over the boxing tent from his father in 1955. Sharman played 45 games between 1935 and 1939, scored 12 tries and kicked 11 goals. He died on 26 April 2006, aged 94. He was awarded life membership in 1998.

Jimmy Sharman's Boxing Tent 

Many famous boxers worked in the Sharman tent, including:

Ronald O'Callaghan
The Black Irish Man (champion) Aboriginal 
Frank Burns (middleweight champion)
Graham Burns, Jeff Burns, Ted Burns, Charlie Burns
Teddy Green (bantamweight)
Harry Mack (featherweight)
Mickey Miller (bantam and featherweight)
George Cook (heavyweight)
Jack Hassen (lightweight)
Billy Grime (triple titleholder)
Jackie Green (triple titleholder)
Dave Sands Aboriginal boxer
Greg McNamara (light-heavyweight)
Famous Indigenous Australians to work in the tent include:
George Bracken, Aboriginal lawyer
Geoff Clark, former ATSIC chairperson
Douglas Nicholls, later Pastor with the Churches of Christ in Australia and then Governor of South Australia
Max Stuart, convicted murderer and Arrente elder

Some boxers came from the Cherbourg Aboriginal mission, near Nanango, Queensland.

Legacy
In 2003 the Royal Agricultural Society of New South Wales honoured Sharman Jr. with the title of "Show Legend".

In popular culture

The Australian rock band Midnight Oil's 1984 album Red Sails in the Sunset includes the song "Jimmy Sharman's Boxers" whose lyrics assert that Sharman exploited the Aboriginal boxers he employed in his show.
The Australian rock band Cold Chisel's song "Yesterdays" has lyrics which refer to Jimmy Sharman's boxers .
The 2007 Peter Carstairs film September features its main characters - 15-year-old boys Ed and Paddy - setting up a boxing ring on Ed's family's wheatbelt property in anticipation of a visit by Sharman's boxing troupe.  Paddy later joins the troupe.
Jimmy Sharman Jr's son Jim Sharman became a theatre and film director known especially for the musicals Hair, Jesus Christ Superstar, The Rocky Horror Show, and the movie version, The Rocky Horror Picture Show.
One Paul Kelly track, "Rally Around the Drum", written with Archie Roach, was about an Indigenous tent boxing man.
Colleen McCullough's novel, The Thorn Birds, features a character joining Jimmy Sharman's troupe.

References

External links 
Pictures:

ADB biography

1887 births
1965 deaths
Australian boxing promoters
Australian male boxers
Australian rugby league players
Boxers from Sydney
Business duos
People educated at St Joseph's College, Hunters Hill
Rugby league players from Sydney
Western Suburbs Magpies players